Hell in a Cell is a professional wrestling steel cage-based match which originated in 1997 in the World Wrestling Federation (WWF, now WWE). It features a large cell structure, a five-sided cuboid made from open-weave steel mesh chain-link fencing which encloses the ring and ringside area. Unlike the steel cage match, the only way to get out of the Hell in a Cell without damaging the Cell's structure is through its door—but this door is locked by thick chains and a padlock. Only an in-ring pinfall or submission will ordinarily result in a win (although Triple H pinned Chris Jericho atop the cell to win the Hell in a Cell match at Judgment Day in May 2002) and there are no disqualifications. The gimmick was strongly associated with the Undertaker during his career with WWF/WWE, including the inaugural match with Shawn Michaels and a brutal encounter with Mick Foley in his Mankind persona. Both matches featured spectacular falls from the top of the cage which became a signature of the match.

The first match took place at Badd Blood: In Your House in October 1997 and a total of 50 Hell in a Cell matches have occurred ever since. The match type spawned its own pay-per-view event in 2009, WWE Hell in a Cell, since which the event has been held annually in October, although once in September and twice in June. This event generally features one to three Hell in a Cell matches on the same card; the main event is always contested as a Hell in a Cell match.

History
The Hell in a Cell match was first introduced at Badd Blood on October 5, 1997, at the Kiel Center, now known as Enterprise Center, in St. Louis, Missouri. The background to the inaugural match was built on The Undertaker's loss to Bret Hart two months prior at SummerSlam in a WWF Championship match which Shawn Michaels was assigned to referee. Michaels had deliberately interjected himself in the match and cost The Undertaker a win which resulted in a match between the two at In Your House: Ground Zero. That match was ruled a no-contest due to the two bypassing and attacking the officials. As a climactic end to the feud, their following bout was originally scheduled to be held as a steel cage match. However,  a larger roofed structure was constructed instead of a normal cage enclosing only the ring, enclosing not only the ring but also the surrounding ringside area. The wider space between the ring apron and the cell walls allowed for entering and exiting the ring and for cameras to be situated at ringside. At Badd Blood, Michaels defeated The Undertaker (with interference from The Undertaker's debuting half-brother Kane), becoming the number-one contender to the WWF Championship. The original concept for the Hell in a Cell structure was created by Jim Cornette. He described his concept as a combination of a cage surrounding the majority of the ringside area (the design, he stated, was popular in Memphis wrestling promotions) and the cage used in both the National Wrestling Alliance and World Championship Wrestling for their WarGames matches (which had a top on the cage). On an October 2015 video podcast, Vince Russo said Cornette probably did come up with the concept, but the name Hell in a Cell came from him. WWE credits the match as being based on the Last Battle of Atlanta.

The 1998 Hell in a Cell match between The Undertaker and Mankind remains one of the most iconic matches of all time, with its level of extreme violence and dangerous spots, which led to Mankind getting legitimately knocked unconscious at the end of the match and suffering multiple injuries towards the end of the match. Despite the match's popularity, it remains controversial due to the wrestler's lack of safety. In 2011, this incident was named the number one "OMG!" incident in WWE history. Journalist Michael Landsberg called it "maybe the most famous match ever." The first title defense in Hell in a Cell was at No Way Out in February 2000 with Triple H defending the WWF Championship against Cactus Jack. The first title change inside Hell in a Cell was in October 2009, when The Undertaker won the World Heavyweight Championship from CM Punk. The longest Hell in a Cell match was held at Bad Blood in June 2004 between Triple H and Shawn Michaels at over 47 minutes. The Undertaker has been involved in the most Hell in a Cell matches, having competed in fourteen and having the most victories at eight. All Hell in a Cell matches have been broadcast live on pay-per-view except for five matches, three of which were televised on Raw Is War, later Monday Night Raw, with two in 1998 and one in 2021 and one on Friday Night SmackDown also in 2021. The Hell in a Cell match on the June 15 episode of Raw Is War showcasing Stone Cold Steve Austin and The Undertaker against Kane and Mankind, ended with Austin and Undertaker winning after Raw Is War went off the air. On the August 24 episode of Raw Is War, Mankind fought Kane (his tag team partner at the time) in a Hell in a Cell match. This match went to a no-contest after Austin interfered and assaulted Kane. On the June 18, 2021, episode of Friday Night SmackDown, the first televised title match contested inside the structure took place between Roman Reigns and Rey Mysterio for the WWE Universal Championship which saw Reigns retain the title via submission. Three days later on the June 21, 2021, episode of Monday Night Raw, WWE Champion Bobby Lashley faced Xavier Woods in a non-title Hell in a Cell match which saw Lashley win via submission. Only one Hell in a Cell match was not televised, the match took place on the September 26 episode of Raw in 2011 as a dark match and lasted only 5 minutes, making it the shortest Hell in a Cell match. Hell in a Cell matches have appeared at WWF/WWE's flagship event WrestleMania three times (XV, XXVIII and 32) and will feature again at the upcoming WrestleMania 39. In 2009, WWE debuted its first pay-per-view event to be named Hell in a Cell.

In 2016, Charlotte Flair and Sasha Banks became the first women to step inside the Hell in a Cell match at Hell in a Cell in October 2016 when Banks defended the Raw Women's Championship against Flair, who won the match.

Ahead of Hell in a Cell in September 2018, the structure went through a significant overhaul. The fully crimson-red structure is smaller, with the wires being less pliable, making the structure stronger, yet lighter. Randy Orton and Jeff Hardy faced off against each other in the first crimson cell, a match which Orton won.

June 18–21, 2021 marked the following records: three shows featuring Hell in a Cell matches (SmackDown, Hell in a Cell PPV, and Raw), the first-ever SmackDown Hell in a Cell match, and the first-ever competitor to compete in 2 back-to-back Hell in a Cell matches (Bobby Lashley).

Kennel from Hell match/Other appearances and variations
The structure itself has made four additional appearances, although WWE does not consider them to be Hell in a Cell matches. During the first-ever First Blood match which was between Kane and Stone Cold Steve Austin at King of the Ring in May 1998, the cell used earlier in the night was lowered. The second featured Big Boss Man challenging Al Snow for the WWF Hardcore Championship in a Kennel from Hell match at Unforgiven in September 1999. The match consisted of a standard steel cage with the cell placed atop it and the object was to escape from both the cage and cell while trying to avoid guard dogs that were placed between the ring and cell door. Snow, the first competitor to escape the steel cage and the cell, was declared the winner. The third time was on the September 28, 2009, episode of Raw during a gauntlet match with John Cena against Chris Jericho, Big Show and Randy Orton. The cell was lowered after Cena defeated Jericho and Big Show by disqualification when Orton's turn came. Cena ordered the cell to be lowered and then brawled Orton on top of the structure. The match was declared a no-contest. The fourth time was on the October 20, 2014, episode of Raw when the Hell in a Cell structure was lowered on orders from Kane during a handicap street fight involving Kane, Orton, and Seth Rollins against Cena and Dean Ambrose which Kane, Orton, and Rollins won. At Hell in a Cell in October 2017, Shane McMahon and Kevin Owens competed in a Hell in a Cell match billed as the first under Falls Count Anywhere rules (despite the Hell in a Cell previously having this stipulation in its rules by default). In October 2020, Roman Reigns and Jey Uso competed in the first-ever Hell in a Cell match contested under an "I quit" stipulation.

Reception
The first Hell in a Cell match between Undertaker and Shawn Michaels was highly acclaimed, with Dave Meltzer giving it 5 stars, a feat that no other Hell in a Cell match would accomplish until the one between Seth Rollins and Cody Rhodes.  Some critics claimed that the Hell in a Cell has been watered down during the last years, most notably the main event between Seth Rollins and "The Fiend" Bray Wyatt in 2019. Former WWE producer Arn Anderson said that WWE overused the concept, as not many rivalries justified a match of that caliber. Answering Anderson, Mick Foley said he did not think the Hell in a Cell had been overused.

List of Hell in a Cell matches
Dallas holds the record for hosting the most Hell in a Cell matches with five (four were held in Dallas proper and one in the western suburb of Arlington). Tampa and Miami are in second place with four Hell in a Cell matches (three were in Miami proper and one in the suburb of Miami Gardens). Orlando, Newark, Boston, and San Antonio are in third place as all three of them have hosted three Hell in a Cell matches.

Participant list

Males

Females

See also 
 Elimination Chamber

References

External links 
 

 
1997 in professional wrestling
WWE match types